In physics and mathematics, in the area of dynamical systems, a double pendulum also known as a chaos pendulum is a pendulum with another pendulum attached to its end, forming a simple physical system that exhibits rich dynamic behavior with a strong sensitivity to initial conditions. The motion of a double pendulum is governed by a set of coupled ordinary differential equations and is chaotic.

Analysis and interpretation
Several variants of the double pendulum may be considered; the two limbs may be of equal or unequal lengths and masses, they may be simple pendulums or compound pendulums (also called complex pendulums) and the motion may be in three dimensions or restricted to the vertical plane. In the following analysis, the limbs are taken to be identical compound pendulums of length  and mass , and the motion is restricted to two dimensions.

In a compound pendulum, the mass is distributed along its length. If the mass is evenly distributed, then the center of mass of each limb is at its midpoint, and the limb has a moment of inertia of  about that point.

It is convenient to use the angles between each limb and the vertical as the generalized coordinates defining the configuration of the system. The position of the center of mass of each rod may be written in terms of these two coordinates. If the origin of the Cartesian coordinate system is taken to be at the point of suspension of the first pendulum, then the center of mass of this pendulum is at:

and the center of mass of the second pendulum is at

This is enough information to write out the Lagrangian.

Lagrangian
The Lagrangian is

The first term is the linear kinetic energy of the center of mass of the bodies and the second term is the rotational kinetic energy around the center of mass of each rod. The last term is the potential energy of the bodies in a uniform gravitational field. The dot-notation indicates the time derivative of the variable in question.

Substituting the coordinates above and rearranging the equation gives

There is only one conserved quantity (the energy), and no conserved momenta. The two generalized momenta may be written as

These expressions may be inverted to get

The remaining equations of motion are written as

These last four equations are explicit formulas for the time evolution of the system given its current state. It is, however, possible to perform this integration numerically using the Runge Kutta method or similar techniques.

Chaotic motion
 

The double pendulum undergoes chaotic motion, and shows a sensitive dependence on initial conditions. The image to the right shows the amount of elapsed time before the pendulum flips over, as a function of initial position when released at rest. Here, the initial value of  ranges along the -direction from −3.14 to 3.14. The initial value  ranges along the -direction, from −3.14 to 3.14. The colour of each pixel indicates whether either pendulum flips within:
  (black)
  (red)
  (green)
  (blue) or
  (purple).

Initial conditions that do not lead to a flip within  are plotted white.

The boundary of the central white region is defined in part by energy conservation with the following curve:

Within the region defined by this curve, that is if

then it is energetically impossible for either pendulum to flip. Outside this region, the pendulum can flip, but it is a complex question to determine when it will flip. Similar behavior is observed for a double pendulum composed of two point masses rather than two rods with distributed mass.

The lack of a natural excitation frequency has led to the use of double pendulum systems in seismic resistance designs in buildings, where the building itself is the primary inverted pendulum, and a secondary mass is connected to complete the double pendulum.

See also
 Double inverted pendulum
 Pendulum (mechanics)
 Mid-20th century physics textbooks use the term "double pendulum" to mean a single bob suspended from a string which is in turn suspended from a V-shaped string. This type of pendulum, which produces Lissajous curves, is now referred to as a Blackburn pendulum.

Notes

References

 Eric W. Weisstein, Double pendulum (2005), ScienceWorld (contains details of the complicated equations involved) and "Double Pendulum" by Rob Morris, Wolfram Demonstrations Project, 2007 (animations of those equations).
 Peter Lynch, Double Pendulum, (2001). (Java applet simulation.)
 Northwestern University, Double Pendulum , (Java applet simulation.)
 Theoretical High-Energy Astrophysics Group at UBC, Double pendulum, (2005).

External links
Animations and explanations of a double pendulum and a physical double pendulum (two square plates) by Mike Wheatland (Univ. Sydney)

Interactive Open Source Physics JavaScript simulation with detailed equations double pendulum
Interactive Javascript simulation of a double pendulum
Double pendulum physics simulation from www.myphysicslab.com using open source JavaScript code
Simulation, equations and explanation of Rott's pendulum

 Double Pendulum Simulator - An open source simulator written in C++ using the Qt toolkit.
 Online Java simulator of the Imaginary exhibition.

Chaotic maps
Dynamical systems
Mathematical physics
Pendulums